Weinek is a surname. Notable people with the surname include:

Ladislaus Weinek (1848–1913), Austro-Hungarian astronomer
7114 Weinek, a main-belt asteroid
Weinek (crater), a lunar crater
Martin Weinek (born 1964), an Austrian actor, wine producer, entrepreneur and entertainer

See also 
Weinegg